Fleming "Alex" Alexander (born 16 April 1945) is a former competition swimmer who represented Australia at the 1964 Summer Olympics in Tokyo.  Alexander competed in the preliminary heats of the 400-metre individual medley, but did not advance; his time of 5:10.8 was the 16th-best at the Tokyo Olympics.

See also
 List of Commonwealth Games medallists in swimming (men)

References

External links 
 
 

1945 births
Living people
Australian male medley swimmers
Olympic swimmers of Australia
Swimmers at the 1964 Summer Olympics
South Carolina Gamecocks men's swimmers
Swimmers at the 1962 British Empire and Commonwealth Games
Commonwealth Games medallists in swimming
Commonwealth Games gold medallists for Australia
20th-century Australian people
21st-century Australian people
Medallists at the 1962 British Empire and Commonwealth Games